Lajayer (also Romanized as Lajāyer) is a village in Ojarud-e Sharqi Rural District, Muran District, Germi County, Ardabil Province, Iran. At the 2006 census, its population was 63, in 14 families.

References

External links 
Tageo

Towns and villages in Germi County